Exciter is the fifth studio album by the Canadian speed metal band Exciter, released through the Canadian label Maze Music in 1988. The album was re-released in 1995 Magnetic Air Records and again by Megaforce Records in 2005 with the title O.T.T., which stands for "Over the Top". This is the first album as a quartet, with new frontman Rob Malnati replacing Dan Beehler as lead vocalist of the band; however Beehler would still perform drums and backing vocals.

Track listing

Bonus track 1995 & 2005 editions

Credits 
 Rob Malnati – lead vocals, guitar
 Brian McPhee – guitar, vocals
 Allan Johnson – bass
 Dan Beehler – drums, vocals

Production
Leidecker Productions – production management
J.C. Caprara – concept
Zoran Busic – management

References 

1988 albums
Exciter (band) albums